Mary Ann Carson is a former member of the Connecticut House of Representatives.

Carson and her husband Douglas have two daughters, Denise Cocozza and Natalie Venskus. She has three grandchildren, Trevor Cocozza, Kevin Cocozza and Luke Venskus. She resides in New Fairfield, Connecticut.

Career
Carson was first elected to the House of Representatives in a special election in 1999. She was re-elected in 2000, 2002, 2004, 2006 and 2008. Carson is a Republican.

References

People from New Fairfield, Connecticut
Republican Party members of the Connecticut House of Representatives
Women state legislators in Connecticut
Living people
Year of birth missing (living people)